Kota North is a constituency of the Rajasthan Legislative Assembly covering the Kota Municipal Corporation in the Kota district of Rajasthan, India.

Kota North is one of eight assembly constituencies in the Kota (Lok Sabha constituency). Since 2008, this assembly constituency is numbered 189 amongst 200 constituencies.

Currently this seat belongs to Indian National Congress candidate Shanti Dhariwal who won in last Assembly election of 2018 Rajasthan Legislative Assembly election by defeating Bharatiya Janta Party candidate Prahlad Gunjal by a margin of 17,945 votes.

Geographical scope
The constituency comprises parts of Tehsil Ladpura (Partly), Kota Municipal Corporation (Partly)- Ward no. 1, 2, 12 to 32 and 49 to 52.

Member of the Legislative Assembly

Election Results

2018 results

2013 results

References

Assembly constituencies of Rajasthan
Kota district